Xyrichtys splendens, the green razorfish, is a species of marine ray-finned fish from the family Labridae, the wrasses. Xyrichtys splendens is found the Western Atlantic Ocean.  

Etymology
The fish's name means beautiful.

References

splendens
Taxa named by François-Louis Laporte, comte de Castelnau
Fish described in 1855